Oleh Tatarov (31 August 1982, Novoukrainka, Kirovohrad Oblast) is a Ukrainian statesman, jurist, and the Deputy Head of the Office of the President of Ukraine.

Early life 

In 2003, Tatarov graduated from the National Academy of Internal Affairs. In 2005, he received a master's degree from the National Academy of Internal Affairs.

In 2010, he graduated from the Taras Shevchenko National University of Kyiv with a degree in accounting and auditing.

Tatarov graduated from the University of London and obtained a European bar license.

Career 

In 1999–2014, he served in the internal affairs agencies.

From 2011 to 2014, he was the Deputy Head of the Main Investigation Department of the Ministry of Internal Affairs.

Since 2014, he has been practicing law, managing partner of Tatarov, Farynnyk, Holovko.

On August 5, 2020, he was appointed Deputy Head of the Office of the President of Ukraine by President Volodymyr Zelenskyy's decree.

Tatarov started in the presidential team by coordinating the work of law enforcement agencies: the National Anti-Corruption Bureau of Ukraine, the Security Service of Ukraine, the State Bureau of Investigation of Ukraine, and the National Police of Ukraine. Later, he was entrusted with patronage over the entire criminal justice system – the bodies of pre-trial investigation, in particular, the prosecutor's office and the courts that hear criminal cases.

Recognition 

In December 2021, Tatarov took 12th place in the top 100 most influential people of Ukraine, according to Focus magazine. According to experts, Oleh Tatarov's influence on the system increased in 2021. First of all, this happened after Arsen Avakov left his post as Minister of Internal Affairs.

Awards 

Honored Lawyer of Ukraine (January 2014).

References 

Living people
1982 births
People from Novoukrainka
Taras Shevchenko National University of Kyiv alumni
Alumni of the University of London
21st-century Ukrainian politicians